Lê Thị Hồng Liên is a Christian teacher from Vietnam. She taught for 
the Mennonite Church in Vietnam. She was arrested in June 2004 along with other members of her church.

She was released from Bien Hoa Mental Hospital on April 28, 2005.

External links 
Amnesty International on her

Vietnamese democracy activists
Vietnamese Mennonites
Vietnamese dissidents
Civil rights activists
Vietnamese human rights activists
Living people
Year of birth missing (living people)
Place of birth missing (living people)